The Cuban boa (Chilabothrus angulifer), also known as the Cuban tree boa and by locals as maja de Santa María, is a very large species of snake in the family Boidae. With lengths exceeding  and a relatively heavy build, the Cuban boa is one of the largest snakes in the world. The species is native to Cuba and some nearby islands. No subspecies are currently recognized.

Etymology
The genus name Chilabothrus is from the Greek cheilos, meaning "lip", á "without" and bothros "pits". The specific name originates from the Latin word angirlus, meaning "angle", probably in reference to the angular shapes of the main elements of the dorsal pattern.

Geographic range
C. angulifer is found in Cuba and on adjacent islands, including Isla de la Juventud (formerly called the Isle of Pines), the Canarreos Archipelago (the Cayo Cantiles), the Colorados Archipelago off the northern coast of Pinar del Río, the Sabana-Camagüey Archipelago (Cayo Guajaba and Cayo Sant María). The type locality given is "Cuba".

Habitat
It has also been found in sugar cane plantations.

Description

The presence of labial pits, the shortest tail of the entire genus and supralabials separated from the eye result in the Cuban boa being the least derived species of the genus Chilabothrus. It is also the largest member of Chilabothrus. The Cuban boa has a quite massive body, of a size typical for a boa or python of far greater length.

Size
However, in average C. angulifer reaches  in total length.

Coloring
Coloration brown with a pattern of staggered dark brown rhombic spots.
Dorsal pattern of 42–65 appressed, angulate, dark brown to black markings on a yellowish to yellow-tan ground, but often (western Cuba) without any dark colors in dorsal pattern, and pattern composed of indeterminate number of medium brown to pale tan, much-fused markings; tail patternless above, or with up to 12 darker dorsal markings.

Scalation
C. angulifer possesses dorsal scale rows at midbody 53–69; ventral scales 272–292 in males, 268–290 in females; subcaudal scales 45–55 in males, 46–54 in females; ventrals + subcaudals 321–347 in males, 316–339 in females; supralabial scales separated from eye; head scale formula* 3–3–4. C. angulifer is different from most other species of the genus in that the is usually completely separated from supralabials by a row of lorilabials and few subcaudals.

Behavior
Despite their large size, Cuban boas are semi-arboreal and climb fairly well. They are usually solitary, sometimes intersecting during the mating season.

Diet

C. angulifer is a terrestrial apex predator in Cuba along with the Cuban crocodile and carnivorous birds. Depending on age, size and health, prey can range from anurans, lizards, snakes, turtles, aquatic birds (Gruiformes), free-ranging raptors (Accipitriformes, Cathartiformes), forest birds (Columbiformes, Cuculiformes, Passeriformes), caged birds (Columbiformes, Galliformes, Falconiformes, Passeriformes, Psittaciformes), free-ranging poultry (Anseriformes, Galliformes), bats, bovids, pigs, carnivores, rabbits, hutias and rats. As a result of data from the literature and field studies, 351 prey items were recorded in 49 different taxa obtained from 218 snakes. Warm-blooded (mammals and birds) made up 96%, while cold-blooded (reptiles and amphibians) only 4%. Mammals made up 54.7% of the total prey items consumed, followed by birds (41.3%), while amphibians (2%) and reptiles (2%) made up only a small part of the diet. The prey species most frequently consumed were domestic fowl (Gallus domesticus) (24.8%), Desmarest's hutias (Capromys pilorides) (14.5%), two bat species (Jamaican fruit-eating bat, Artibeus jamaicensis: 8.8%; Cuban flower bat, Phyllonycteris poeyi: 6.0%), and black rats (Rattus rattus) (7.7%).

Reproduction
C. angulifer is viviparous. Females are biennial breeders and take five or more years to mature. Mating season is normally April though June. Males will mate every year and engage in ritualized combat. Size, not age, determines the female's ability to reproduce. Gestation in the wild is typically 150–180 days. Gestation length appears to reflect the temperatures the females are exposed to while gravid. Parturition normally takes place in September and October. Litter sizes range from 2–22 young in the wild. There appears to be a correlation between the size of the female and litter/neonate size: the larger the female the larger the litters and babies. Neonatal C. angulifer are among the largest within the family (505–646 mm SVL, 80–237 g). Only neonatal Boa constrictor and Eunectes murinus are of comparable sizes.

Maturation

C. angulifer reaches maturation for breeding at three years old for males, and five years old for females. Captive snakes reach breeding maturity at larger sizes than non-captive snakes.

Longevity
In the wild, Cuban boas can live in excess of 30 years. Although the reproductive potential is still poorly understood, long term studies are quantifying the missing or inconclusive data. In captivity, specimens continuously reproduced at the age of 30 plus years.

Conservation status
C. angulifer was classified as "Least Concern" (LC) in 2021.

References

Further reading
Boulenger GA (1893). Catalogue of the Snakes in the British Museum (Natural History). Volume I., Containing the Families ... Boidæ .... London: Trustees of the British Museum (Natural History). (Taylor and Francis, printers). xiii + 448 pp. + Plates I–XXVIII. (Epicrates angulifer, p. 96).
Cocteau J-T, Bibron G (1838). "Reptiles ". pp. 1–143. In: de la Sagra R (1838). Historia Physica, Politica y Natural de la Isla de Cuba. Historia Natural. Tomo IV. Reptiles y Peces. Paris: Arthus Bertrand. 255 pp. (Epicrates angulifer, new species, pp. 129–130). (in Latin and Spanish).
Reynolds RG, Niemiller ML, Hedges SB, Dornburg A, Puente-Rolón AR, Revell LJ (2013). "Molecular phylogeny and historical biogeography of West Indian boid snakes (Chilabothrus)". Molecular Phylogenetics and Evolution 68 (3): 461–470. (Chilabothrus angulifer, new combination).
Schwartz A, Thomas R (1975). A Check-list of West Indian Amphibians and Reptiles. Carnegie Museum of Natural History Special Publication No. 1. Pittsburgh, Pennsylvania: Carnegie Museum of Natural History. 216 pp. (Epicrates angulifer, p. 183).

angulifer
Snakes of the Caribbean
Reptiles of Cuba
Endemic fauna of Cuba
Taxa named by Jean Theodore Cocteau
Taxa named by Gabriel Bibron
Reptiles described in 1840
Taxonomy articles created by Polbot

Apex predators